Hate Them is the ninth studio album by Norwegian black metal band, Darkthrone. It was released 10 March 2003 by Moonfog Productions. Like their subsequent release, Sardonic Wrath, the album had an electronic intro and outro created by Lars Sørensen (aka LRZ) from Red Harvest. The cover image was the work of Eric Syre from Thesyre, and incorporated images of the Sagrada Família Catholic church in Barcelona. In 2012, the album was reissued by Peaceville Records, including a bonus CD with audio commentary by the band.

Track listing

Credits

Darkthrone
Nocturno Culto – vocals, guitar, bass
Fenriz – drums, lyrics

Production
Lars Klokkerhaug – engineering
Tom Kvålsvoll – mastering
Martin Kvamme – layout
Eric Syre – artwork
Nocturno Culto – layout

References 

Darkthrone albums
2003 albums
The End Records albums